Lonely Avenue is an album by saxophonist David Newman, featuring performances recorded in 1971 for the Atlantic label.

Reception

Allmusic awarded the album 3 stars calling it "An OK but not too essential LP".

Track listing
 "Fuzz" (Roy Ayers) - 7:23
 "Precious Lord" (Traditional) - 5:25
 "Symphonette" (David Newman, Charles "Bags" Costello) - 8:50
 "Lonely Avenue" (Doc Pomus) - 7:14
 "3/4 of the Time" (Roger Newman) - 7:27
 "Fire Weaver" (Ayers) - 7:13

Personnel 
David Newman - tenor saxophone, flute
Roy Ayers - vibraphone, piano, organ
Charles "Bags" Costello - organ
Cornell Dupree - guitar
Bill Salter - bass 
Ray Lucas - drums
Ralph MacDonald - percussion

References 

1972 albums
David "Fathead" Newman albums
Albums produced by Joel Dorn
Atlantic Records albums